WUSF (89.7 FM) is the flagship National Public Radio member station in the Tampa Bay area.   It is licensed to Tampa and owned by the University of South Florida. WUSF signed on in 1963, seven years after USF's founding in 1956. It joined NPR in 1976 and was the first public radio station in the country—and the first station of any kind in Florida—to launch HD radio.

WUSF's current format features news and talk programming 24 hours a day, 7 days a week, outsourced from NPR and other public radio production outfits. Its HD Radio feed features classical music from sister station WSMR.

In 2010, USF acquired Sarasota Christian radio station WSMR 89.1 MHz from Northwestern College of Roseville, Minnesota. USF planned to change that station's format to classical music. It would inherit most of the classical music inventory of WUSF, which would switch to a format of NPR news and nighttime jazz programming. WSMR's current reception area is focused on the Sarasota-Bradenton area; however, the station's programming will be available online and on WUSF's HD subcarrier. WUSF's format was changed on September 15, 2010; WSMR's relaunch, also scheduled for that day, was delayed due to technical issues. WSMR's sale to USF also includes W280DW, a repeater of WSMR in Brandon that broadcasts on 103.9 MHz and serves Pasco and northern Hillsborough counties; the repeater will continue to repeat WSMR, with the new classical format.

Two weeks after the failed launch of classical replacement WSMR, station management came under public scrutiny  for neglecting to perform due diligence regarding the purchase of the WSMR transmitter. According to a Bradenton Herald article:

Arthur Doak, an engineer for the FCC, said there was no record of WUSF or Northwestern College conducting an inspection on the tower but said stations are entitled to a review of tower sites.
“If the buyer wanted it done to protect themselves, certainly they could,” Doak said. “That’s between the buyer and the seller.”

On October 20, 2022, WUSF announced that it will drop jazz programming later that month.

See also
 List of jazz radio stations in the United States

References

External links

NPR member stations
University of South Florida media
USF
USF (FM)
1963 establishments in Florida
Radio stations established in 1963